Gerald F. Hoyt (January 29, 1929 – July 11, 1955) was an American racing driver from Chicago, mainly competing in the National Championship. He died on July 11, 1955 after crashing in a sprint car race at Oklahoma City.

Indy 500
In the 1955 Indianapolis 500 Hoyt surprised many, including himself, by winning the pole (first starting position) in qualifications. His average speed for the run of 140.045 miles per hour was at the time the second fastest ever at the speedway. However an oil leak would force him to retire from the race after 40 laps. As the 500 was part of the FIA World Championship at the time, Hoyt was credited for being the youngest pole sitter in the history of the series to that point. In his four races at the speedway, he would never complete more than 130 laps in the 200 lap race.

Death
On July 11, 1955, two months after winning the pole at Indianapolis, Hoyt was entered into a sprint car race in Oklahoma City. On the first lap, his car made contact with a fence, causing it to overturn. The cars of the time provided little protection for the driver's head, and Hoyt died the next morning of brain injuries. He had been married just two weeks earlier.

He is buried at Crown Hill Cemetery in Indianapolis.

Indianapolis 500 results

Although Hoyt started the 1955 race from the pole position, his qualifying speed ranked tenth behind fastest qualifier Jack McGrath. This is the lowest speed rank for a pole sitter in the Indianapolis modern era.

Complete Formula One World Championship results
(key) (Races in bold indicate pole position; races in italics indicate fastest lap)

 * Indicates shared drive with Andy Linden and Chuck Stevenson
 † Indicates shared drive with Paul Russo

World Championship career summary
The Indianapolis 500 was part of the FIA World Championship from 1950 through 1960. Drivers competing at Indy during those years were credited with World Championship points and participation. Jerry Hoyt participated in 4 World Championship races, starting on the pole once but scoring no World Championship points.

References

External links 
 

1929 births
1955 deaths
Indianapolis 500 drivers
Indianapolis 500 polesitters
Racing drivers from Chicago
Racing drivers who died while racing
Sports deaths in Oklahoma
AAA Championship Car drivers
Burials at Crown Hill Cemetery